Pier Paolo Lucchetta (born January 14, 1963) is an Italian former volleyball player who competed in the 1984 Summer Olympics and in the 1988 Summer Olympics. He was born in Treviso. Four years later he won the bronze medal with the Italian team in the 1984 Olympic tournament. He played all six matches.

References

1963 births
Living people
Italian men's volleyball players
Olympic volleyball players of Italy
Volleyball players at the 1984 Summer Olympics
Volleyball players at the 1988 Summer Olympics
Olympic bronze medalists for Italy
Sportspeople from Treviso
Olympic medalists in volleyball
Medalists at the 1984 Summer Olympics